Rock 'n India was an annual music festival organised by event management company DNA Networks in conjunction with Nous Productions at the Palace Grounds in Bangalore. It was launched in 2008 as India's only music festival. Rock 'n India gave Indian bands the opportunity to play in front of large audiences alongside international artists. Throughout its existence, the festival featured iconic rock acts such as Megadeth, Machine Head, Iron Maiden, Biffy Clyro, Metallica and Slayer.

The day-long festival featured in excess of 10 hours of live performances. In addition to a concert area, Rock 'n India included a carnival area with various stalls and activities, such as an extreme sports zone, a gaming zone, a food court, and interactive stalls.

2008
The first Rock 'n India festival was held on 14 March 2008. It included Indian bands such as Keinan and Sai, in addition to heavy metal headliners such as Megadeth and Machine Head. Over 14,700 people attended, exceeding expectations. The festival used two separate stages: "Stage A," the main stage for the headline acts, and the smaller "Stage B" for the opening bands. The headlining act by Megadeth was criticised for poor sound quality. Rock 'n India was the first Indian rock festival to have an air guitar contest podium.

2009
Iron Maiden headlined the second festival on 15 February 2009, as part of the last leg of their Somewhere Back in Time World Tour. This was the band's third visit to the subcontinent, having held the first concert of this tour, as well as a performance on the last leg of their A Matter of Life and Death Tour, in Bangalore. The 2009 festival had attractions similar to those of the previous year, with the addition of a tattoo bar and an exhibition by the Force India Formula 1 team. The festival promoter was criticised for not making tickets available outside of Bangalore, which was cited as a major cause for the event's low ticket sales compared to its predecessor. Only an estimated 17,000 people attended. To compound the issues, the festival promoters were unable to obtain licenses for pyrotechnics and smoke machines.

2010
The headliners for Rock 'n India 2010 were the Backstreet Boys, Richard Marx, Jayce Lewis, Prime Circle.

2011
Rock 'n India 2011 took place in Bangalore on 30 October and was headlined by Metallica, supported by Biffy Clyro. This was Metallica's first performance in India. The Indian bands Guillotine and Inner Sanctum also performed. Attendance for the event was reported at around 29,000. Earlier it had been reported that the 2011 Rock 'n India would be cancelled.

2012
The 2012 festival was a low-key affair which featured Slayer performing on 20 October, and Carlos Santana on 26 October. Each concert only garnered a few thousand people. This edition would turn out to be the last as major sponsor pullouts and declining attendance figures resulted in the festival being retired; the Rock 'n India name has been retired according to the sponsors.

References

http://metalbase.in/no-rock-n-india-in-2013-says-dna/

External links
DNA Networks webpage for Rock 'N India 
Interview of Bruce Lee Mani of Thermal and A Quarter – EF News International
http://www.myspace.com/brandonashleyandthesilverbugs
http://www.myspace.com/cyanideserenity
https://web.archive.org/web/20130820035841/http://www.poetsofthefall.com/tourdates/

Rock festivals in India